Rasmus Bonde Nissen (born 26 September 1986) is a Danish badminton player.

Career
Bonde won three gold medals at the 2005 European Junior Championships in the boys' doubles, mixed doubles and mixed team event. In 2007, he won the amongst others the Swedish International, Czech International, Dutch Open, Portugal International, and in 2009 at the Norwegian International, and the Spanish International.

Achievements

European Championships 
Men's doubles

European Junior Championships
Boys' doubles

Mixed doubles

BWF Grand Prix 
The BWF Grand Prix has two levels: Grand Prix and Grand Prix Gold. It is a series of badminton tournaments, sanctioned by the Badminton World Federation (BWF) since 2007.

Mixed doubles

 BWF Grand Prix Gold tournament
 BWF Grand Prix tournament

BWF International Challenge/Series
Men's doubles

Mixed doubles

 BWF International Challenge tournament
 BWF International Series tournament

Invitation Tournament
Men's doubles

References

External links
 

1986 births
Living people
Danish male badminton players